This is a List of A1 Grand Prix seasons, that is a list of the A1 Grand Prix championship seasons since the inaugural 2005–06 season. This list is accurate up to and including the 2008–09 season.

Summary

* Switzerland scored 99 points in total, but due to the lack of cars available at the opening round at Zandvoort, only the best six rounds counted towards the championship.

Champions
The champion's trophy is awarded to the most successful A1 Grand Prix team over a season, as determined by a pointscoring system based on results. The teams' championship was first awarded in 2005–06, to A1 Team France.

References

Seasons